Several units of the Royal Canadian Navy have been named HMCS Giffard.

 , a  renamed Toronto before commissioning. The ship served in the Battle of the Atlantic during the Second World War.
 , a  that served in the Battle of the Atlantic during the Second World War.

Battle honours

 Atlantic, 1944

References

 Government of Canada Ships' Histories - HMCS Giffard

Royal Canadian Navy ship names